Himanshu Sharma is an Indian film writer and producer who works in Hindi cinema. He is most well known as the writer of the Tanu Weds Manu series (2011 & 2015) and Raanjhanaa (2013), all of which were considered highly successful domestically. His screenwriting for the films was generally received with praise.

Early life and education
Himanshu Sharma was born to Jiwan Sharma, a U.P. Tourism officer and Shama Sharma in Lucknow. Himanshu did his schooling from Spring dale College, Lucknow and later moved to Kirori Mal College, Delhi for higher education, where he started taking part in theatre.

Personal life
Himanshu has one younger sister and a brother, and he was in a relationship with Bollywood actress Swara Bhaskar. In January 2021, Himanshu married  Kanika Dhillon.

Career
He started his career with NDTV as script writer for a health show. Subsequently, he moved to Mumbai to pursue his career in serials and movies. He wrote the script for many TV serials like Kkusum on Sony TV and Bhootwala on SAB TV. He made his film writing debut with the movie Strangers, with Nandana Sen and Jimmy Sheirgill, produced by Raj Kundra. He is a member of International Film And Television Club of AAFT. Himanshu Sharma is also part of Colour Yellow Productions, which co-produced Raanjhanaa and Tanu Weds Manu: Returns.

Filmography

Writer

Creative producer

Producer

Awards and nominations

Nominations
 2012 Best Dialogue: Star Screen awards for Tanu Weds Manu (2011)
 2012 Best Dialogue: IIFA Singapore awards for Tanu Weds Manu (2011)
 2012 Best Story: Filmfare awards for Tanu Weds Manu (2011)
 2012 Best Story: Apsara awards for Tanu Weds Manu (2011)
 2014 Best Story: Star guild award for Raanjhanaa (2013)
 2014 Best Dialogue: Star guild award for Raanjhanaa (2013)
 2014 Best Screenplay:Star guild award for Raanjhanaa (2013)
 2014 Dialogue of the year : Star guild award for Raanjhanaa (2013)
 2014 Best Story: Zee Cine award for Raanjhanaa (2013)
 2014 Best Dialogue: Zee Cine award for Raanjhanaa (2013)
 2014 Best Screenplay: Zee Cine award for Raanjhanaa (2013)
 2016 Best Story: Star Screen award for Tanu Weds Manu: Returns (2016)
 2016 Best Dialogue: Star Screen award for Tanu Weds Manu Returns (2016)
 2016 Best Screenplay: Star Screen award for Tanu Weds Manu Returns (2016)
 2016 Best Dialogue: TOIFA award for Tanu Weds Manu Returns (2016)
 2016 Best Dialogue: National Film Awards for Tanu Weds Manu Returns (2016)
 2016 Best Story: National Film Awards for Tanu Weds Manu Returns (2016)

Wins
 2014 Best Dialogue: Star Guild award for Raanjhanaa (2013)
 2014 Best Dialogue: Zee Cine award for Raanjhanaa (2013)
 2016 Best Dialogue: Filmfare award for Tanu Weds Manu: Returns (2016)
 2016 Best Dialogue: TOIFA award for Tanu Weds Manu Returns (2016)
 2016 Best Dialogue: National Film Awards Tanu Weds Manu Returns (2016)
 2016 Best Story: National Film Awards for Tanu Weds Manu Returns (2016)

References

Filmography

Male actors in Hindi cinema
Indian male screenwriters
Indian male film actors
1981 births
Living people
Male actors from Lucknow
Indian television writers
Kirori Mal College alumni
Writers from Lucknow
Screenwriters from Uttar Pradesh
Film producers from Uttar Pradesh
Best Original Screenplay National Film Award winners
Best Dialogue National Film Award winners
Male television writers